The Amazing Johnathan Documentary is a 2019 documentary film, directed by Ben Berman.

Cast 

 The Amazing Johnathan as himself
 Eric André as himself
 Benjamin Berman as himself
 Simon Chinn as himself
 Judy Gold as herself
 Penn Jillette as himself
 Max Maven as himself
 Jon Mugar	as himself
 Chadd Smith as himself
 Anastasia Synn as herself
 Doreen Szeles as herself
 Doug Szeles as himself
 Chad S. Taylor as himself
 Carrot Top as himself
 Weird Al Yankovic as himself

Reception 
The website's critical consensus reads, "The Amazing Johnathan Documentary sets out to survey a magician's final tour -- and ends up pulling off some wildly ambitious tricks of its own." Metacritic, which uses a weighted average, assigned the film a score of 52 out of 100, based on 13 critics, indicating "Mixed or average reviews".

Peter Debruge writing for Variety wrote, "Berman eventually does prove to be rather resourceful, pulling off a coup that surprises even Johnathan in the end — and that’s no easy trick". John DeFore of The Hollywood Reporter wrote, "Ben Berman's Untitled Amazing Johnathan Documentary offers a helpful reminder to aspiring doc-makers out there: There's more to the job than just following someone around with a camera".

References

External links 

 

2019 films
2019 documentary films
American documentary films
2010s English-language films
2010s American films